Altria Group v. Good, 555 U.S. 70 (2008), was a United States Supreme Court case in which the Court held that a state law prohibiting deceptive tobacco advertising was not preempted by a federal law regulating cigarette advertising.

Background 
The lawsuit claimed that Altria's marketing of "light" and "low tar" cigarettes constituted fraudulent misrepresentations under the Maine Unfair Trade Practices Act (MUTPA)  because it deceived smokers into thinking the products are safer than regular cigarettes.

The District Court granted summary judgment in favor of Altria, finding the state-law claim pre-empted by the Federal Cigarette Labeling and Advertising Act, 15 U.S.C. §1334(b) (Federal Labeling Act).  The First Circuit reversed, holding that the Labeling Act neither expressly nor impliedly pre-empted respondents' fraud claim.

The Court's decision was therefore meant to answer the following question: Does federal preemption of the Maine Unfair Trade Practices Act hinge on the express or implied nature of the allegedly fraudulent misrepresentations?

Opinion of the Court 
Justice John Paul Stevens, writing for a 5-4 Court, held that neither the Labeling Act's pre-emption provision, nor the Federal Trade Commission's actions in this field, expressly or impliedly preempt claims related to "smoking and health" under the Maine statute. Pp. 5–20.

Adopting the reasoning it used in Cipollone v. Liggett Group, Inc., the Court found that claims based on a common law legal duty ("predicate-duty" approach, e.g. a manufacturer's duty not to misrepresent its products), were not preempted simply because they related to cigarette manufacturers and the labeling of its products.

(a) Congress may indicate preemptive intent through a statute's express language or through its structure and purpose.  See Jones v. Rath Packing Co., 430 U. S. 519 . When the text of an express preemption clause is susceptible of more than one plausible reading, courts ordinarily "accept the reading that disfavors preemption." Bates v. Dow Agrosciences LLC,   544 U. S. 431 . The Labeling Act's stated purposes are to inform the public of the health risks of smoking while protecting commerce and the economy from the ill effects of nonuniform requirements to the extent consistent with the first goal. Although fidelity to these purposes does not demand the preemption of state fraud rules, the principal question here is whether that result is nevertheless required by 15 U. S. C. §1334(b), which provides that "[n]o requirement or prohibition based on smoking and health shall be imposed under State law with respect to the advertising or promotion of any cigarettes the packages of which are labeled in conformity with the provisions of this chapter." Pp. 5–9.

(b) Respondents' claim is not expressly pre-empted by §1334(b).  As determined in Cipollone v. Liggett Group, Inc., 505 U. S. 504, and Lorillard Tobacco Co. v. Reilly, 533 U. S. 525, the phrase "based on smoking and health" modifies the state-law rule at issue rather than a particular application of that rule. The Cipollone plurality concluded that "the phrase 'based on smoking and health' fairly but narrowly construed" did not preempt the Cipollone plaintiff's common-law claim that cigarette manufacturers had fraudulently misrepresented and concealed a material fact, because the claim alleged a violation of a duty not to deceive—a duty that is not "based on" smoking and health. 505 U. S., at 528–529. Respondents here also allege a violation of the duty not to deceive as codified in the MUTPA, which, like the common-law duty in Cipollone, has nothing to do with smoking and health. Respondents' claim is not analogous to the "warning neutralization" claim found to be preempted in Cipollone.  Reilly is consistent with Cipollone's analysis.  This Court disagrees with petitioners' alternative argument that the express pre-emption framework of Cipollone and Reilly should be rejected. American Airlines, Inc. v. Wolens, 513 U. S. 219, and Riegel v. Medtronic, Inc., 552 U. S. ___, are distinguished.  Pp. 9–16.

(c) Various Federal Trade Commission decisions with respect to statements of tar and nicotine content do not impliedly preempt state deceptive practices rules like the MUTPA. Pp. 17–20.

Dissent 
Justice Clarence Thomas disagreed with the majority's adoption of the "predicate-duty" approach from Cipollone, arguing it was confusing and unworkable. Rather, he argued that the Court should adopt a clear test that expressly preempts any state law claim that "imposes an obligation...because of the effect of smoking upon health."

See also 
 Cipollone v. Liggett Group, Inc. (1992)

References

External links
 
 Scotus Wiki, Altria v. Good (contains briefs, summaries, and other resources)
 Case Briefs
 
 
 

United States Supreme Court cases
United States federal preemption law
2008 in United States case law
United States tobacco case law
Altria Group
Philip Morris litigation
United States Supreme Court cases of the Roberts Court